Manat may refer to
 Azerbaijani manat, unit of currency in Azerbaijan
 Turkmenistani manat, unit of currency in Turkmenistan
 The designation of the Soviet ruble in both Azerbaijani and Turkmen
 Manāt, the goddess of fate and destiny in pre-Islamic Arabia
 the Manat language of Papua New Guinea
 MANAT may refer to 5601 Squadron (Israel), Israeli Air Force Flight Test Center

See also 
Manatee